The McKeesport Area School District is a school district serving the City of McKeesport, and boroughs of Versailles, Dravosburg and White Oak (except for a small portion) and South Versailles Township (except for a small portion).

Schools 
The McKeesport Area School District operates two elementary schools; Francis McClure and Twin Rivers, one middle school; Founder's Hall and one high school; the McKeesport Area High School. The District also operates the McKeesport Area Technology Center, which provides career and technical education programs to 10th, 11th, and 12th grade students.

Extracurriculars
The district offers a variety of clubs, activities and sports.

Sports
The District funds:

Boys
Baseball – AAAA
Basketball- AAAA
Cross Country – AAA
Football – AAAA
Golf – AAA
Soccer – AAA
Swimming and Diving – AAA
Tennis – AAA
Track and Field – AAA
Wrestling	– AAA

Girls
Basketball – AAAA
Cross Country – AAA
Golf – AAA
Soccer (Fall) – AAA
Softball – AAAA
Swimming and Diving – AAA
Girls' Tennis – AAA
Track and Field – AAA
Volleyball – AAA

Founders Hall Sports

Boys
Baseball
Basketball
Football
Soccer
Swimming and Diving
Track and Field
Wrestling	

Girls
Basketball
Softball 
Soccer
Swimming and Diving
Track and Field
Volleyball

According to PIAA directory July 2012

References

External links

School districts in Allegheny County, Pennsylvania
Education in Pittsburgh area
School districts established in 1884